A courtesy name, also known as a style name, is a name bestowed upon one at adulthood in addition to one's given name. This practice is a tradition in the East Asian cultural sphere, including China, Japan, Korea, and Vietnam.

A courtesy name is not to be confused with an art name, another frequently mentioned term for an alternative name in East Asia, which is closer to the concept of a pen name or a pseudonym.

Usage
A courtesy name is a name traditionally given to Chinese men at the age of 20 sui, marking their coming of age. It was sometimes given to women, usually upon marriage. The practice is no longer common in modern Chinese society. According to the Book of Rites, after a man reached adulthood, it was disrespectful for others of the same generation to address him by his given name. Thus, the given name was reserved for oneself and one's elders, whereas the courtesy name would be used by adults of the same generation to refer to one another on formal occasions or in writing. Another translation of zi is "style name", but this translation has been criticised as misleading, because it could imply an official or legal title.

Generally speaking, courtesy names before the Qin dynasty were one syllable, and from the Qin to the 20th century they were mostly disyllabic, consisting of two Chinese characters. Courtesy names were often based on the meaning of the person's given name. For example, Chiang Kai-shek's given name (romanized as Chung-cheng) and courtesy name (romanized as Kai-shek) are both from the yù hexagram of I Ching.

Another way to form a courtesy name is to use the homophonic character zi – a respectful title for a man – as the first character of the disyllabic courtesy name. Thus, for example, Gongsun Qiao's courtesy name was Zichan, and Du Fu's: Zimei. It was also common to construct a courtesy name by using as the first character one which expresses the bearer's birth order among male siblings in his family. Thus Confucius, whose name was Kong Qiu, was given the courtesy name Zhongni, where the first character zhong indicates that he was the second son born into his family. The characters commonly used are bo for the first, zhong for the second, shu for the third, and ji typically for the youngest, if the family consists of more than three sons. General Sun Jian's four sons, for instance, were Sun Ce (Bófú), Sun Quan (Zhòngmóu), Sun Yi (Shūbì) and Sun Kuang (Jìzuǒ).

Reflecting a general cultural tendency to regard names as significant, the choice of what name to bestow upon one's children was considered very important in traditional China. Yan Zhitui of the Northern Qi dynasty asserted that whereas the purpose of a given name was to distinguish one person from another, a courtesy name should express the bearer's moral integrity.

Prior to the twentieth century, sinicized Koreans, Vietnamese, and Japanese were also referred to by their courtesy name. The practice was also adopted by some Mongols and Manchus after the Qing conquest of China.

Examples

See also
 Cognomen, the third name of a citizen of ancient Rome

References

Chinese culture
Chinese language
Japanese culture
Korean culture
Vietnamese culture